Bhullar is a village in Batala in Gurdaspur district of Punjab State, India. The village is administrated by Sarpanch an elected representative of the village.

Bhullar Mobile Workshop
Mohali Chandigarh 

Google Map
Bhullar Mobile Workshop

References 

Villages in Gurdaspur district